Kochi Haruno Athletic Stadium (高知県立春野総合運動公園陸上競技場), is a multi-purpose stadium in Haruno, Kōchi, Japan.  It is currently used mostly for amateur level football matches. A few J1 League, J2 League and Emperor's Cup matches has also been played at the stadium. The stadium holds 25,000 people.

References

Football venues in Japan
Athletics (track and field) venues in Japan
Rugby union stadiums in Japan
Multi-purpose stadiums in Japan
Sports venues in Kōchi Prefecture
Kōchi
Sports venues completed in 1987
1987 establishments in Japan